Kamarata Airport  is an airport serving the village of Kamarata in the Bolívar state of Venezuela.

The runway and village are at the base of an alluvial fan on the southeastern side of Auyán-tepui, the mesa that hosts Angel Falls.

See also
Transport in Venezuela
List of airports in Venezuela

References

External links
 OurAirports - Kamarata
 OpenStreetMap - Kamarata Airport

Airports in Venezuela